Haratbar (also Romanized as Harātbar) is a village in Baladeh Rural District, Khorramabad District, Tonekabon County, Mazandaran Province, Iran. According to the 2006, its population consists of 66 families totalling to about 225 people.

References 

Populated places in Tonekabon County